Achlysiella williamsi is a plant pathogenic nematode in the genus Saccharum which parasitizes sugarcane (Saccharum officinarum).

References 

Agricultural pest nematodes
Parasites of plants
Sugarcane diseases
Tylenchida
Nematodes described in 1989